Elections to West Sussex County Council were held on 1 May 1997, alongside a parliamentary general election. The whole council was up for election, and the Conservative Party regained control of the council from the Liberal Democrats who had governed since 1993 as a minority administration . Turnout across the county ranged from 57.7% in Richmond to 78.6% in Lindfield.

Election Result

|}

Results by electoral division

Adur

Arun

Chichester

Crawley

Horsham

Mid Sussex

Worthing

References

1997 English local elections
1997
1990s in West Sussex